= Provisional name =

A provisional name is a name used to designate an entity which has not received an official name.

Provisional name may refer to:

- Undescribed taxon, a biological taxon that is recognized as distinct but has not received a formal name
- Provisional designation in astronomy for an astronomical object that has not received a formal name
